Yi Sun-sin Stadium is a multi-purpose stadium in Asan, South Chungcheong Province, South Korea. It has a seating capacity for 17,376 spectators.

References

External links
World Stadiums profile

Football venues in South Korea
Multi-purpose stadiums in South Korea
Sports venues completed in 2008
2008 establishments in South Korea
K League 2 stadiums